The Wolves of Hazaribagh were a pack of five man-eating Indian wolves which between February and August 1981, killed 13 children aged from 4 to 10 years. Their hunting range was 2.7 square miles (7 square km) around the town of Hazaribagh in the eastern Indian district of Bihar. They were apparently attracted to the area by the town's rubbish dump, where livestock carcasses and bodies from the local mortuary were often buried, and frequently attracted wolves, striped hyenas, golden jackals and pariah dogs.

One of the first attacks occurred on 15 February 1981, when a wolf entered a yard bordered by brushwood and attacked a young boy. The boy's cries attracted several people, who attacked the wolf with wooden poles, beating it to death. Throughout the next six months, the remaining wolves killed 13 children and mauled 13 others. On a night of June 1981, they were seen via a headlight to be exhuming and eating a human corpse. During the year, 4 wolves were killed, the last of which, thought to be the dominant male, was caught in a scrub forest and shot.

Another report Human-Wolf Conflict in human dominated landscapes of Ahmednagar District, Maharashtra states that in the Hazaribagh area, 80 children were attacked - 60 of them fatally - between April 1993 and April 1995 (Rajpurohit 1999). It was thought that five wolf packs were responsible for the attacks. Indeed, Hazaribagh appears to be particularly
prone to wolf attacks on children; as attacks have been a regular occurrence over a large area in Hazaribagh from the 1930s onwards (and perhaps even before this), it seems likely that a number of
packs have been in operation over the years (Linnell et al. 2002).

See also
List of wolves

References
"Wolves and wild dogs", from Man-Eaters, Michael Bright, Robson books, 2000
 http://projectwaghoba.in/docs/roopa_krithivasan_indian_wolf_report_2009.pdf

Hazaribagh
Hazaribagh
Man-eaters of India
1981 in India
Hazaribagh
History of Jharkhand (1947–present)
Individual wild animals